Benoît Laliberté (born July 18, 1972) is a Canadian entrepreneur and inventor and is currently a Senior Member of Investel Capital Corporation. He is the founder of JITEC, Vectoria Inc., TeliPhone Corp., and the New York Telecom Exchange Inc. Earlier in his career, Laliberté gained some notoriety in Quebec with JITEC, a public company which at its peak in 2000 had an estimated value of $CDN575 million. More recently, he invented several technologies in telecommunications, social media, and information technology (IT).

Early years

Benoît Laliberté was born in Mont-Saint-Hilaire, Québec, Canada. He started his own business called Jitec in 1986 at the age of fourteen, building computer systems in his basement for friends and family.  He dropped out of college to work full-time on JITEC.  After working at JITEC for several years as sole proprietorship, he incorporated the company in 1992 and began to sell computers, software and related components in Canada.

The Growth of JITEC

In 1994, Laliberté created Vectoria Inc., a portfolio of companies involved in software, information technology, and telecommunications. In conjunction with Vectoria, JITEC created the first electronic virus immune computer using its Electronic Virus Activity Control (EVAC) technology. EVAC was built into computer servers to immediately detect and prevent viruses. By 1996, JITEC had CDN$7 million in annual sales and 45 employees. This led to him winning the Young Entrepreneur of the Year award by the Business Development Bank of Canada (BDC).

In 1997, Laliberté created Windows Based Intelligent Terminals (WINBIT) and POWERVEC servers. He worked with Microsoft to develop the first generation of cloud computing services. In July 2000, JITEC was listed on the Montreal Stock Exchange after a successful IPO. At this point, Laliberté's personal net worth was in excess of $345 million.

Controversy

JITEC was growing rapidly; its stock had jumped from CDN$3.80 in late July 2000 to CDN$11.65 in only a few weeks. This sudden success caught the attention of many, including multi-millionaire Herbert Black, who then became a friend and advisor to Laliberté. However, unbeknownst to Laliberté, Black had a well established history of profiting from the short selling of companies' stocks. Soon after becoming involved with Laliberté, Black allegedly began this process with JITEC. He reported Laliberté to the Quebec Security Commission (QSC) and accused him of insider trading and irregular transactions. He put immense pressure on the QSC to have a cease trade order issued against JITEC, which triggered an investigation. Meanwhile, JITEC stock was falling rapidly based on leaked information to the media. On Nov 10th, 2000, Paul Trudeau, principal investigator for the QSC in the case signed an affidavit required for the QSC to issue a personal cease trade order on Laliberté and an investigation was initiated. This resulted in his forced resignation as CEO the following day, the same day that Black had initiated a class action suit against JITEC, CIBC, Canaccord, and Laliberté himself for losses incurred with the drop in share price. However, at the same time Black was shorting the stock at $10 thereby benefitting from the stock's drop. In 2011, after conducting an extensive investigation, the CIBC filed as part of its defence, that Black himself alone was responsible for the drop in share price.

A small article in the Journal de Montréal in 2002 reported that Paul Trudeau, the QSC investigator, was reinstated after being arrested and subsequently fired for receiving a bribe of $1,000 from Herbert Black in 2000. Black, who had not disclosed to Trudeau the personal interests he had in the fall of the stock price, was revealed to have shorted the stock of JITEC through insider trading with privileged information. He had apparently manipulated the Commission des Valeurs Mobilières du Québec (CVMQ- now the Authorité des Marchés Financiers, AMF) in hopes of profiting from the downfall of the JITEC stock: he was short selling stocks while informing other investors of alleged irregularities in order to decrease its price (Black had been previously linked to a Commodity Futures Trading Commission lawyer and investigator, Dennis O'Keefe who was disbarred in 2005 based on conflict of interest charges from his 1995 investigation of Sumitomo Corp. for copper price fixing which resulted in a $150 million settlement in 1998). Black denied these allegations. When this was brought to the attention of Laliberté, he immediately filed a lawsuit against the QSC for a record-breaking $127 million in November 2003 on the basis that the QSC was complacent with Black in the demise of JITEC .  It was later revealed that Laurent Lemieux, another senior QSC investigator involved in the JITEC case had leaked information on the investigation to the press and was also fired. In what some have viewed as retaliatory, subsequent to Laliberté launching the lawsuit the QSC initiated actions on securities infractions.

The entire affair has been widely reported in Canadian media. On September 23, 2013, the Montreal newspaper La Presse published an article on Laliberté, which chronicled his business life since 2000.

In October 2014 the case was settled for 9.85 million. A court-appointed claims administrator is currently in the process of dealing with all claims in the matter.

Laliberté still owe more than 56 millions dollars to the government.

Inventions

Laliberté, through Investel Capital Corporation, currently holds several international patents and patents-pending. Among those are:

Paid-to-View

In 2013 Laliberté developed Paid-to-View, a patent-pending technology primarily for streaming content services such as Cable TV and IPTV whereby subscribers have the option to watch their television programs with a branded overlay provided by advertisers. Based on the length of time this overlay is used, advertisers provide incentives such as reduction of their telecommunications bill, discounts, and cash by check or prepaid credit card. Geolocation filters and demographics determine the overlay options and incentives provided.

Investel filed for a patent for Paid-to-View in Canada under application number 2,917,948, in the US under serial number 14/993,661, and internationally under the Patent Cooperation Treaty, application number PCT.CA2014/050628.

In 2013 Laliberté invented , an online system for creating advertising campaigns on social media. This consists of a back office platform for the advertiser and a smartphone and tablet application which allows users to upload branded content onto their social media accounts. It also provides users with a permanent personal digital copyright watermark on their content. Users can then be paid for sharing this content on social media when they select an  sponsor or advertiser and permit  to overlay the sponsor or advertiser's logo or message on it. Once the content is posted, the user receives a financial credit to their  account.  users can also choose to support affinity groups such as charities, schools, local sports teams, and community initiatives by donating their credits automatically and instantly to these organizations.

In June 2016  was granted patent number 2,887,596 in Canada.

In August 2016, Investel filed a lawsuit in the Federal Court of Canada against Snapchat for patent infringement related to the  patent.

Internet Personal Communication Service (iPCS)

In 2014, Laliberté developed the Internet Personal Communication System (iPCS), a Smartphone Over IP (SoIP) technology which uses data only to provide all voice and text services from a cloud-based platform. iPCS utilizes a thin client which interfaces with the cloud to provide enhanced  security and access to all iPCS functionality.  It operates seamlessly between Wi-Fi and 4G/LTE and can be used anywhere where wireless data is the available.

The service is login-based and any iPCS subscriber can therefore use any phone with any iPCS SIM card to access their account and services. No user data or user profile information resides on the device as everything is stored in the iPCS cloud. iPCS uses generic and identical SIM cards, which are used only to provide access to its network, making the subscriber independent from any SIM, device, or network. Any iPCS-enabled device can be used by any iPCS subscriber via the login procedure, allowing for multiple profiles on a single device.

Investel filed for six patents for iPCS in Canada under application numbers 2,910,654, 2,910,520, 2,871,283, 2,871,290, 2,871,249, and 2,871,247, and internationally under the Patent Cooperation Treaty number PCT/CA2015/051119.

iPCS was developed with the support of the Canadian Scientific Research and Experimental Development Program (SRED). It was launched in beta in October 2014.

Other Projects

TeliPhone Corp. 
TeliPhone Corp., founded in August 2004, is an Internet-based digital telecommunications company specializing in hosted business telephony systems that reduce customer capital equipment costs while offering global incoming and outgoing call services. With its own technology, it has developed its International IP-based telecommunications network.

The New York Telecom Exchange 

In October 2008, Laliberté created the New York Telecom Exchange (NYTEX) which was based on the principles of a traditional commodity exchange.  NYTEX was incorporated in the State of New York and Laliberté became its chief technology officer. He commoditized international termination, creating a reference quality for each market. This allowed telecommunications to be traded like oil or any other commodity with multiple and anonymous buyers and sellers on a neutral electronic platform.

TeliPhone Navigata-Westel

In December 2012, TeliPhone Corp. acquired Vancouver-based Navigata Communications 2009, Inc., a major provider of voice and data services with most of its operations in Western Canada. Now TeliPhone Navigata-Westel, it is one of the largest independent facilities-based Competitive Local Exchange Carriers (CLEC) in Canada. It provides services such as voice, data, Internet broadband, IT support, Cloud computing, and IPTV to carriers, business, government, and residential clients.

In August 2014, following the successful restructuring of TNW, he announced that he was leaving the company to pursue other projects.

Investel Capital Corporation

In 2013, Laliberté helped to conceive Investel Capital Corporation (ICC), an investment fund based in Vancouver and Toronto which specializes in the acquisition of distressed or underachieving telecommunications companies for the purpose of financial turnaround. ICC also develops technology-based intellectual property.

Companies acquired by ICC have access to ICC's resources and network infrastructure. This creates the conditions for increased margins through reduced costs via economies of scale, shared overhead, and management resources as well as lower costs through increased buying power.

References
 Ravensbergen, Jan. "PC Guy." The Gazette [Montreal] 28 Oct. 1996: C3. Print.
 MacGregor, Alison. "Helping the Little Guys out." The Gazette [Montreal] 23 June 2000, Business sec.: C2. Print.
 MacDonald, Don. "Jitec, Herbert Black Clash." The Gazette [Montreal] 14 Oct. 2000, Business sec.: G1, G3. Print.
 MacDonald, Don. "Jitec Gets the Runaround." The Gazette [Montreal] 20 Mar. 2001, Business sec.: D1. Print.
 Gibbens, Robert. "Jitec Clears Founder of Wrongdoing." National Post [Toronto] 25 May 2001, Financial sec.: C5. Print.
 Vailles, Francis. "Benoit Laliberté poursuit le courtier Canaccord." La Presse [Montreal] 3 Oct. 2003, Affaires sec.: 4. Print.
 Marotte, Bertrand. "Ex-Jitec Boss Suing Quebec Watchdog." Globe and Mail [Toronto] 12 Nov. 2003, Business sec. Print.
 Bisson, Alan. "Des accusations criminelles ont été portées contre un ex-enquêteur de la CMVQ." Le Journal De Montréal 19 Nov. 2003, Affaire sec.: 58. Print.
 Baril, Hélène. "La CMVQ accepte de continuer à payer un enquêteur congédie." La Presse [Montreal] 25 Nov. 2003, Affaires sec.: 4. Print.
 Cousineau, Sophie. "Le côté obscur de Herbert Black." La Presse [Montreal] 26 Nov. 2005, Affaires sec.: 1-3. Print.
 Tedesco, Theresa. "A Question of Proper Conduct." National Post [Toronto] 19 Nov. 2004, Financial Post sec.: 1, 6, 7. Print
 Arcand, Denis. "Benoît Laliberté devant la Cour." La Presse [Montreal] 29 Oct. 2007, Affaires sec.: 1, 4. Print.

External links
 http://affaires.lapresse.ca/bourse/201309/23/01-4692058-benoit-laliberte-vise-le-nasdaq.php
 https://web.archive.org/web/20110125133613/http://www.investorvoice.ca/PI/1433.htm
 https://web.archive.org/web/20101130071646/http://www.teliphone.ca/corp/
 http://www.investmentexecutive.com/client/en/News/DetailNews.asp?id=26252&pg=1&IdSection=148&IdPub=
 https://web.archive.org/web/20110726112354/http://lapresseaffaires.cyberpresse.ca/economie/200901/06/01-690757-benoit-laliberte-blame-unmillionnaire-de-montreal.php
 https://web.archive.org/web/20140207020458/https://www.teliphone.com/announce_02.html
 https://web.archive.org/web/20140207075505/https://www.teliphone.com/announce_05.html
 https://web.archive.org/web/20150814123430/https://www.teliphone.com/corp/index.html
 https://web.archive.org/web/20141129072456/http://finance.yahoo.com/news/teliphone-navigata-westel-communication-inc-230000577.html

1972 births
Living people
Canadian chief executives